Koranit (lit. Thyme) is a community settlement in northern Israel. Located in the Galilee on Mount Shekhanya, it falls under the jurisdiction of Misgav Regional Council.

History
The village was established in 1978 as a moshav shitufi, and was later converted to a community settlement.

References

Community settlements
Former moshavim
Agricultural Union
Populated places established in 1978
Populated places in Northern District (Israel)
1978 establishments in Israel